Al-Sabinah is a town in southern Syria, administratively part of the Rif Dimashq Governorate, located southwest of Damascus in the western Ghouta. Nearby localities include Ashrafiyat Sahnaya, Darayya, Muadamiyat al-Sham, Sayyidah Zaynab, al-Hajar al-Aswad. According to the Syria Central Bureau of Statistics, al-Sabinah had a population of 62,509 in the 2004 census. Sbeineh Camp, a Palestinian refugee camp, was established beside the town in 1948.

References

Populated places in Markaz Rif Dimashq District
Palestinian refugee camps in Syria